Euan Drennan Henderson (born 29 June 2000) is a Scottish footballer who plays as a forward for Queen's Park, on loan from Heart of Midlothian.

Career
Henderson joined Hearts at under-15 level from Hutchison Vale, and made his debut against Celtic in May 2017.

He was loaned to Montrose for most of the 2018–19 season.

Henderson scored his first goal for the Hearts first team in a Scottish Cup match against Airdrie on 18 January 2020.

He moved on loan to Alloa Athletic in September 2021. He was recalled in January 2022.

On 27 January 2023, Henderson joined Scottish Championship club Queen's Park on loan until the end of the season. Queen's Park used Henderson in a Scottish Cup match against Inverness CT on 31 January, even though he had been signed by the club after the original scheduled date for the tie. This was an apparent breach of the competition rules, and Queen's Park were ejected from the cup after a disciplinary hearing.

Career statistics

References

2000 births
Living people
Scottish footballers
Heart of Midlothian F.C. players
Scottish Professional Football League players
Association football forwards
Footballers from Edinburgh
Lothian Thistle Hutchison Vale F.C. players
Montrose F.C. players
Alloa Athletic F.C. players
Queen's Park F.C. players